Bed and Sofa is the English name of a 1927 Soviet silent film originally released in the Soviet Union as Tretya meshchanskaya, and is sometimes referred to as The Third Meschanskaya.  In addition to the title, Bed and Sofa it was also released outside of the Soviet Union under the alternate titles of Three in a Cellar, Old Dovecots, and Cellars of Moscow. The film gets its Russian title from the street on which the main characters live, Third Meshchanskaia Street.

Directed by Abram Room and written by Room and Viktor Shklovsky, the film starred Nikolai Batalov as the husband, Kolia, Lyudmila Semyonova as the wife, Liuda, and Vladimir Fogel as the friend, Volodia.  Billed as a satire and comedy, Bed and Sofa nonetheless portrayed the realities of the Moscow working poor, while also dealing with starkly sexual situations, such as polygamy and abortion.  It was originally banned in both the United States and Europe due to those stark sexual situations.

The screenplay was supposedly based on the true love story of the acclaimed Russian poet Vladimir Mayakovsky who lived with his "muse" Lilya Brik and her husband Osip Brik for some years. The characters themselves also resembled the trio, with Vladimir Fogel as Mayakovsky, Lyudmila Semyonova as Lilya and Nikolai Batalov as Osip Brik. The parallels were so obvious that some critics and associates accused Viktor Shklovsky of indelicacy and gossiping. Shklovsky himself never openly admitted it, yet in his diaries he mentions that during the work on the screenplay they «were living next to Mayakovsky and Lilya Brik», which is an obvious hint.

While movies made in the USSR would soon be regulated to the ideals of Soviet realism, some films at this time were able to present starker themes.  Even so, Bed and Sofa was controversial at the time of release in the Soviet Union, due to its focus on human relationships, while the state and the party are almost completely disregarded.  In fact, at one point Kolya even declines to go to a Party meeting. In addition, the film's resolution is ambiguous and comes about without any input from the collective.

However, it is now considered a landmark film because of humor, naturalism, and its sympathetic portrayal of the woman.

Plot

The story centers on the relationship of the three main characters.  Liuda and her husband, Kolia, live in a one-room basement apartment on Third Meschchanskaya Street, a petty-bourgeois neighborhood in Moscow.  She is bored and resentful with the constant succession of household duties and the cramped living conditions in which she must cook and attempt to organize her clothes, even though there is no place to put them.  She spends her days idly, mostly by reading magazines, notably the popular (at that time) Soviet film fan magazine Soviet Screen (Sovetskii ekran).  Kolia works as a stonemason and is charming and good-natured, but also dictatorial and egocentric.  When Kolia's old friend, Volodia, arrives in Moscow, he cannot find a place to live in the overcrowded city, due to a severe housing shortage which was still a major social problem ten years after the revolution.  Kolia invites him to stay at their apartment, to sleep on the sofa.

The apartment, which was cramped to begin with, is all of a sudden much smaller, which understandably annoys Liuda, but she puts it off as just another sign of Kolia's disregard for her.  Yet Volodia quickly wins her over by his helpful behavior, as well as bestowing her with gifts.  There is a sexual tension between the two from his arrival, and when Kolia has to leave town for a job, Volodia takes advantage of his friend's absence by openly seducing Liuda.  A climax of this seduction comes when Volodia takes Liuda on a plane ride over Moscow.  It is the first time she has left the apartment since the beginning of the film.

When Kolia returns from his trip, he finds himself to be the one relegated to sleeping on the couch.  Initially outraged, he calms down and the three settle into a polygamous, domesticated routine.  However, now that Volodia taken over the role of "husband," he unfortunately begins acting like one, not at all as he had been when he was the outsider. In fact, he is even less sensitive and more dictatorial than Kolia.

Meanwhile, the two men are bonding, joking and playing checkers while Liuda pouts.  She begins sleeping with both men (at different times).  Eventually, the inevitable happens, and she becomes pregnant, and since no one knows who the father is, both men insist she have an abortion.  The climax of the film comes when she is sent off to a private “clinic” to have the abortion.  She waits for her turn with a prostitute and a young girl.  As she waits, she is looking out the clinic's window, where she sees a baby in a carriage on the sidewalk below.  Suddenly, Liuda decides to take control of her own life, to have the baby and also to leave the corruption of Moscow.

In the closing scene in the film, Liuda is seen on a train, leaving town.  She is smiling, leaning out the train's window.  This is cross cut with shots of Kolia and Volodia, her two erstwhile “husbands”, at first being annoyed with her departure, but then being relieved that they can now return to their carefree bachelor lives in their dingy basement apartment on Third Meshchanskaya Street.

Cast

Nikolai Batalov as Kolia, the husband 
Lyudmila Semyonova as Liuda, the wife 
Vladimir Fogel as Volodia, the friend 
Leonid Yurenyov as The Porter
Yelena Sokolova as The Nurse
Mariya Yarotskaya

Themes

The film is viewed as a brilliant psychological chamber drama that lay bare the dysfunctions and contradiction of early Soviet society. From the opening shot, we know that we are not going to see a schematic narrative about enthusiastic revolutionaries.  The film is a frank portrayal of sexual manners of the 1920s, as well as the living conditions in Moscow in the time, which are in sharp contrast to the official picture of a state where everything was to be the perfect idyll of Soviet life.  Abram Room had intended not only to make a picture exploring the social problems of urban life during the last years of the New Economic Policy (1921–28), but specifically to support the state's campaign against the sexual freedom of the revolutionary years and against abortion on demand.

Production

Like many early Soviet directors, Abram Room (1894–1976) had come to the cinema along a circuitous path. A physician specializing in psychiatry and neurology, he served as a medical officer with the Red Army during the Russian civil war that followed the revolutions of 1917. Originally from Lithuania, Room decided to stay in Moscow after demobilization and began to work in the Theater of the Revolution.

Instead of following in the footsteps of other Soviet directors like Eisenstein and glorifying the struggles of the masses, Room produced a film with only three principals.

The film was shot on location in Moscow.  The acting is highly naturalistic, complementing Room's objective camera. There is a good deal of the use of mirrors and blocking of characters to emphasize mood and the narrative thrust.  The triangle is often depicted visually as well, with the two men on-screen while Liuda's picture on the wall hovers between them. When matters reach their head, Liuda significantly removes the picture from the frame and places it back on the wall, signaling an abrupt change in the relationship, this time for good.

Release

Because of negative publicity prior to its release, the film was released under an alternate title, Ménage à trois, on 15 March 1927.

Critical response and reception

None of Room's three previous pictures, two short comedies from 1924 that are no longer extant, and the action adventure, The Bay of Death  (Bukhta smerti, 1926), prepared critics or audiences for Bed and Sofa.

Quickly recognized as a masterpiece of silent film art, the Association of Revolutionary Cinematography (ARK) praised the film in its journal Cinema Front (Kino-front) as "one of the most successful pictures of Soviet production."  The film's producer, the state-run studio Sovkino, offered the film for international distribution, but it was banned in Western Europe and also in New York, although it was available for showing elsewhere from Amkino Corp., for its sexual content. However, through film societies and their associated private clubs, the film managed to be widely seen in the west.

The film met with mixed reactions, for reasons having nothing to do with the quality of the film.  In 1927, the Soviet government was preparing for the Cultural Revolution, which would begin the following year, after which the arts in the Soviet Union would be stripped of creative autonomy and simply become a propaganda arm of the state.  This would result in 1934 with the Soviet Writers’ Congress adopting a credo of Socialist Realism.  Room and his film were swept up by this coming change, as a carefully orchestrated campaign ridiculing the film was carried out by the trade newspaper, Cinema (Kino), the magazine, Soviet Cinema, and ironically, the very magazine shown being read by Liuda in the film, Soviet Screen.  The negative rhetoric became so heated that eventually the film had to be released under the name Menage a trois.

A. Zuev, the reviewer for Pravda, criticized the title under which the film had been released, Ménage à trois, and the personalities of the male characters, while still praising the acting.

Rediscovered during the 1970s, the film has become regarded as a great little masterpiece of the silent era.  Today, the film is recognized as one of the masterpieces of Soviet silent films.  The Russian Guild of Film Critics voted it the sixth-best film from the first half-century of Russian cinema (1908-1957).  As a work of art,  Bed and Sofa  remains a superb example of European silent film. Given its context and subtext, it must also be considered one of the most important films in early Soviet cinema history.

DVD
A DVD of the film was released in 2004 by Image Entertainment, as a package with the 1925 silent film Chess Fever.  The DVD also features audio commentary by Julian Graffy, professor of Russian Literature and Cinema at the School of Slavonic and East European Studies, University College, London.  He had previously written a book about the movie, Bed and Sofa: The Film Companion, in 2001.

A second DVD was released in 2012, produced by David Shepard's Film Preservation Associates.  This two-disc set features two complete versions of the film.  The first disc contains the picture with English subtitles, superimposing overlays translating the Cyrillic into English. The second notably provides the original version, complete with unaltered Russian subtitles.

Other versions
In 1979, feminist Canadian director Kay Armatage released a 12-minute-long version of the film; the story was more directly seen from the woman's point of view. A stage musical adaptation of the same name was written by Polly Pen (composer) and Laurence Klavan (librettist), premiering "Off Broadway" on 1 February 1996. The European Premier was produced by Neil Franklin and Claire Evans on 29 March 2011 at London's leading Off-West End, Finbrough Theatre, starring Alastair Brookshaw, Alastair Parker and Kaisa Hammarlund and directed by Luke Sheppard.

References

External links
 
 An Appreciation of Bed and Sofa (1927) by David Robinson

1927 comedy films
1927 films
Soviet comedy films
Russian comedy films
Soviet silent feature films
1920s feminist films
Polygamy in fiction
Films about abortion
Films directed by Abram Room
Soviet black-and-white films
1920s satirical films
1920s political films
Russian black-and-white films
Silent comedy films